Astigarraga  is a town located in the province of Gipuzkoa, in the Autonomous Community of Basque Country, in northern Spain. It is famous for its hard cider and the cider houses.

References

External links
 Official Website Information available in Spanish and Basque.
 ASTIGARRAGA in the Bernardo Estornés Lasa - Auñamendi Encyclopedia (Euskomedia Fundazioa) Information available in Spanish

Municipalities in Gipuzkoa